Ponmana Selvan is a 1989 Indian Tamil-language drama film, directed by P. Vasu. The film stars Vijayakanth, Shobana, Vidhyashree, Gemini Ganesan and B. Saroja Devi. 
The film's score was composed by Ilaiyaraaja and was released on 15 August 1989. The film was one of the super hits of the year. The film was a remake of the Kannada film Karunamayi for which Vasu had written the screenplay.

Plot
Ambalakarar and Meenakshi have four children - Raja, Raghu, Ravi and Radha. The family is highly respected in their home town for always standing up for justice. They successfully fight to keep alcohol from being sold in town. Meenakshi's older brother, Ammavasai, joins the family after a years-long feud but still harbors resentment. He gets the two younger brothers - Raghu and Ravi - to start drinking. Hong Kong Annamalai, the local Nataamai, has a daughter, Parvathi that's recently returned home. She falls for and pursues the clueless Raja. Marriages are arranged for both Raghu and Ravi. Parvathi maneuvers her father and Ambalakarar into arranging her marriage with Raja as well. As the wedding talks take place, Annamalai won't permit his daughter to marry Raja as he is the adopted son of the couple. The other three are their biological children and this is the first time any of the children learn the truth. Raghu and Ravi, egged on by their uncle and Annamalai, treat Raja very poorly. At the two youngest brothers' insistence, their respective marriages take place. Kaadher Baai, Ambalakarar's closest friend, is in desperate need of money for his daughter's wedding and steals a necklace from his friend. Raja stops the theft but gets caught when returning the necklace. He takes the blame for attempted theft and gets kicked out of the home. This leaves Ammavasai with free rein and he is instrumental in the younger brothers leaving home. Raja must deal with the problems in his family while also working to establish his business and reunite with Parvathi.

Cast

 Vijayakanth as Raja
 Shobana as Parvathi
 Vidhyashree as Radha
 Gemini Ganesan as Ambalakarar 
 B. Saroja Devi as Meenakshi 
 Goundamani as Hong Kong Annamalai
 Jaishankar as Mettupalayam Jameen
 Radha Ravi 
 V. K. Ramasamy Kaadher Baai
 S. S. Chandran as Ammavasai
 Ravikiran
 Udayashankar
 Pradeep
 Vaithi
 Dr. Muthu
 Rafi
 Sindhu
 Anjana
 Srilatha
 Sanjeev Venkat as Parvathi's brother

Soundtrack
The music was composed by Ilaiyaraaja.

References

External links
 

1989 films
Films directed by P. Vasu
Films scored by Ilaiyaraaja
1980s Tamil-language films
Indian action drama films
Tamil remakes of Kannada films
1980s action drama films